Gayle Chong Kwan (born 1973)  is a London-based artist whose large-scale photographic, installation, and video work has been exhibited and published internationally.

She is known for her large-scale mise-en-scene environments and photographs, created out of waste products, found materials and documentary sources, and which are often sited in the public realm.

Education
Chong Kwan is a Research Candidate in Fine Art at the Royal College of Art, London, (2012-). She holds a BA Hons Politics and Modern History, University of Manchester (1994), where she specialised in Post-Colonial Politics in Sub-Saharan Africa; an MSc in Communications, University of Stirling  (1995); and a BA Hons Fine Art, Central Saint Martins College of Art and Design (2000).

Awards
Arts Council England International Fellow (2005)
Pépinières Européennes pour Jeunes Artistes Award (2005)
Vauxhall Collective Photography Award (2008)
Royal Scottish Academy Award (2013)
Refocus: the Castlegate mima Photography Prize, Middlesbrough Institute of Modern Art (mima) and Stockton-on-Tees Borough Council (2013). A commission to produce ""Arripare"
'Wandering Waste', Stills, Edinburgh, and Deveron Arts, Huntly, Royal Scottish Academy Award (2014)
FATHOM Award, Four Corners, London (2014)
British Council/Arts Council England International Artist Award - 'Photography in the Public Realm New York' (2015)

Personal life
Chong Kwan was born in Edinburgh to a Scottish mother and a Chinese-Mauritian father. She lives with her two sons (born in 2009 and 2015), in Leytonstone, London.

References

External links

1973 births
Living people
British contemporary artists
Photographers from London
British women photographers
Artists from Edinburgh